John Decker (b. Leopold von der Decken, November 8, 1895 – June 8, 1947) was a painter, set designer and caricaturist in Hollywood during the 1930s and 1940s.

Life and work

John Decker was born in Berlin, Germany. As a teenager, Decker lived in London, painting scenery in theatres; this was interrupted by the advent of the First World War, when he was arrested as an enemy alien and interned on the Isle of Man. In 1921, he changed his name to John Decker and emigrated to America, where he worked as a cartoonist for the New York Evening World until 1928, when he moved to Hollywood and took up fine art.  

Many film stars, including Anthony Quinn, Errol Flynn, Charlie Chaplin, Greta Garbo, and the Marx Brothers, commissioned Decker to paint their portraits, and many of his works were used in films: the paintings of the frustrated artist protagonist in Fritz Lang's 1945 film Scarlet Street were actually by Decker. One of his most famous portraits, depicting his friend and drinking companion W.C. Fields as Queen Victoria, hung for many years at Chasen's Restaurant in West Hollywood, California. An oil painting of John Wayne, which Wayne commissioned Decker to paint in 1945, sold for $71,700 at a John Wayne estate auction conducted by Heritage Auctions on October 6, 2011. Like his friends Fields and John Barrymore, the years of seemingly endless drinking sprees wreaked massive damage on his body, resulting in a premature death. Decker died in Hollywood on June 8, 1947, at age 51.

Family background 

Decker's mother, Maria Anna Avenarius (1865–1918), was an opera singer, performing Wagnerian operas in Berlin and Bayreuth. Her father, Ferdinand Avenarius, was an actor. Decker's father, Graf Ernst August von der Decken (1867–1934), grew up in the castle Ringelheim in Salzgitter, Germany, and became a reporter for British and German newspapers. His parents met in the operas of Berlin and Bayreuth. In 1897, two years after their son's birth, they moved to London and married in April 1898 in Greenwich.

Decker's grandfather Graf Georg von der Decken was a member of the German Reichstag. Like his grandson, George was an artist and created huge oil paintings of his castle, paintings for the neighbouring church, and carved wooden sculptures.

Gallery
The Silver Screen, caricature studies of Hollywood actors and actresses of the 1920s and 1930s to a mural decoration 1941:

References

Further reading
 Jordan, C. Stephen. Hollywood's Original Rat Pack: The Bards of Bundy Drive Scarecrow Press, 2008. .
 Mank, Gregory William with Charles Heard and Bill Nelson. Hollywood's Hellfire Club: The Misadventures of John Barrymore, W.C. Fields, Errol Flynn and "The Bundy Drive Boys". Feral Press, 2007. .

External links
Capsule biography of John Decker at CalArt website
"Rogues Gallery: John Decker, in the Shadows of Hollywood's Golden Age", March 2005 article by Richard Rushfield
"Before the Rat Pack, another wild bunch" July 2005 article by Rushfield for the Los Angeles Times
John Decker: The Master of Satire 2004 article with examples of paintings by theartofilm a blog
Useless. Insignificant. Poetic. article on John Decker and his friends the famous actors
Pictures I Like: John Decker  by mikulpepper 2017

Examples of Decker's work
Harmony
Wilshire Bowl mural study (1941), at the National Portrait Gallery, Smithsonian Institution
Four artworks in the National Portrait Gallery, Smithsonian Institution, with four gouaches, colorful caricatures of famous actors
Anthony Quinn (1943), oil on panel, from the Anthony Quinn Collection, displayed at the Museum of Texas Tech University
John Wayne (1945), oil on panel
Sadakichi Hartmann (1946), portrait at the Laguna Art Museum

1895 births
1947 deaths
American caricaturists
German caricaturists
20th-century German painters
20th-century German male artists
German male painters
John
German expatriates in the United Kingdom
German emigrants to the United States